The 1961–62 Ranji Trophy was the 28th season of the Ranji Trophy. Bombay won the title defeating Rajasthan in the final.

Highlights
 Prakash Bhandari scored a hundred in 60 minutes against Rajasthan in the semifinal which was then the fastest hundred in Ranji trophy.

Group stage

South Zone

West Zone

Central Zone

East Zone

North Zone

Knockout stage

Final

Scorecards and averages
Cricketarchive

References

External links

1962 in Indian cricket
Ranji Trophy seasons